Fatmawati Soekarno Airport , formerly Padang Kemiling Airport, is an airport in Bengkulu, a city in the Bengkulu province of Indonesia. It is named after Fatmawati Soekarno (1923–1980), the First Lady of Indonesia, married to Soekarno, the first President of Indonesia who was born in the town. The distance from the city to this airport is 14 km.

Facilities
At present the airport has a 2,500 m x 45 m runway with an asphalt surface. It was managed by the UPT Directorate General of Transportation, which is transferred to Angkasa Pura II. The largest types of aircraft that can operate at this airport are Airbus A320 , A321 and Boeing 737.

Construction of a new terminal in two stages is undertaken to anticipate the movement of 5.6 million passengers, and to operate as an international airport.

Airlines and destinations

Statistics

References

External links
 Fatmawati Soekarno Airport - Indonesia Airport global website
 
 Official Fatmawati Soekarno Airport website

Bengkulu (city)
Airports in Sumatra
Buildings and structures in Bengkulu